Mireval is a commune in the Hérault department in Occitanie in southern France. Vic-Mireval station has rail connections to Narbonne, Montpellier and Avignon.

It is famous for its muscat wine, the Muscat de Mireval, about which François Rabelais wrote at the beginning of the 16th century.

Population

Gallery

See also
Communes of the Hérault department

References

Communes of Hérault